"San Francisco Bound" is a song by Irving Berlin, published by the Berlin & Snyder Company in 1913. The sheet music's cover proclaims that it was "successfully featured by Amy Butler". A recording by the Peerless Quartet was popular in 1913.

References

External links 
"San Francisco Bound" sheet music from the University of Colorado's Digital Sheet Music Collection.

Songs written by Irving Berlin
Songs about trains